Állatkert was an above-ground station of the M1 line of the Budapest Metro. It existed between Széchenyi fürdő and Hősök tere from 1896 to 1973.

When the M1 line was built, Állatkert and Széchényi fürdo were both above ground stations. In 1973, in connection with the extension to Mexikói út, the line was enclosed along with Széchényi fürdo station; and the site of Állatkert station became abandoned.

References 

Metro stations in Budapest
Abandoned rapid transit stations
Railway stations opened in 1896
Railway stations closed in 1973
1896 establishments in Hungary
1973 disestablishments in Hungary